Phaea beierli is a species of beetle in the family Cerambycidae. It was described by Chemsak in 1999. It is known from Honduras.

References

beierli
Beetles described in 1999